The Federal Republic of Germany, as a federal state, consists of sixteen states (sing. ; colloquially also (sing.) /(pl.) , "Federate State/s").

The Federal Republic of Germany ("West Germany") was created in 1949 through the unification of the three western zones previously under American, British, and French administration in the aftermath of World War II. Initially, the states of the Federal Republic were Baden (until 1952), Bavaria, Bremen, Hamburg, Hesse, Lower Saxony, North Rhine-Westphalia, Rhineland-Palatinate, Schleswig-Holstein, Württemberg-Baden (until 1952), and Württemberg-Hohenzollern (until 1952). West Berlin, while still under occupation by the Western Allies, viewed itself as part of the Federal Republic and was largely integrated and considered as a de facto state. In 1952, following a referendum, Baden, Württemberg-Baden, and Württemberg-Hohenzollern merged into Baden-Württemberg. In 1957, the Saar Protectorate joined the Federal Republic as the state of Saarland.

The next change occurred in the aftermath of German reunification in 1990, in which the area of the German Democratic Republic (East Germany) became part of the Federal Republic, by accession of the re-established eastern states of Brandenburg, Mecklenburg-West Pomerania, Saxony, Saxony-Anhalt, and Thuringia to the Federal Republic and by the de facto reunification of West and East Berlin into Berlin and its establishment as a full and equal state. A regional referendum in 1996, to merge Berlin with surrounding Brandenburg as "Berlin-Brandenburg", failed to reach the necessary majority vote in Brandenburg, while a majority of Berliners had voted in favour.

Federalism is one of the entrenched constitutional principles of Germany. According to the German constitution, some topics, such as foreign affairs and defence, are the exclusive responsibility of the federation (i.e., the federal level), while others fall under the shared authority of the states and the federation. The states retain residual or exclusive legislative authority for all other areas, including "culture", which in Germany includes not only topics such as the financial promotion of arts and sciences, but also most forms of education and job training (see Education in Germany).

States
It was the states that formed the Federal Republic of Germany in 1949. This was in contrast to the post-war development in Austria, where the national Bund ("federation") was constituted first, and then the individual states were carved out as units of that federal nation.

The German use of the term Länder ("lands") dates back to the Weimar Constitution of 1919. Previously, the states of the German Empire had been called Staaten ("states"). Today, it is very common to use the term Bundesland (federated Land). However, this term is not used officially in the constitution of 1919 nor in the current one. Three Länder call themselves Freistaaten ("free states", an older German term for "republic"): Bavaria (since 1919), Saxony (originally from 1919 and again since 1990), and Thuringia (since 1994). Of the 17 states at the end of the Weimar Republic, six still exist (though partly with different borders):
 Bavaria
 Bremen
 Hamburg
 Hesse 
 Saxony
 Thuringia

The other 11 states of the Weimar Republic either merged into one another or were separated into smaller entities:
 Anhalt is now part of the state of Saxony-Anhalt.
 Baden is now part of Baden-Württemberg.
 Braunschweig is now part of Lower Saxony.
 Lippe is now part of North Rhine-Westphalia.
 Lübeck is now part of Schleswig-Holstein.
 Mecklenburg-Schwerin and Mecklenburg-Strelitz are now parts of Mecklenburg-Vorpommern.
 Oldenburg is now part of Lower Saxony, with its former exclaves now belonging to their neighbouring states of Rhineland-Palatinate and Schleswig-Holstein.
 Prussia was divided into the states of Berlin, Brandenburg, Lower Saxony, North Rhine-Westphalia, Rhineland-Palatinate, Saxony-Anhalt and Schleswig-Holstein. Some territories bordering other states were annexed to the bordering state. Also, Prussia had exclaves that were surrounded by other states. These became part of their surrounding states. All states, except Bavaria, now have territory of the former Free State of Prussia. Other former Prussian territories lying east of the rivers Neisse and Oder are now part of Poland or Russia.
 Schaumburg-Lippe is now part of Lower Saxony.
 Württemberg is now part of Baden-Württemberg.

Possible boundary changes between states continue to be debated in Germany, in contrast to how there are "significant differences among the American states and regional governments in other federations without serious calls for territorial changes" in those other countries. Arthur B. Gunlicks summarizes the main arguments for boundary reform in Germany: "the German system of dual federalism requires strong Länder that have the administrative and fiscal capacity to implement legislation and pay for it from own source revenues. Too many Länder also make coordination among them and with the federation more complicated." But several proposals have failed so far; territorial reform remains a controversial topic in German politics and public perception.

List

History

Federalism has a long tradition in German history. The Holy Roman Empire comprised many petty states, numbering more than 300 in around 1796. The number of territories was greatly reduced during the Napoleonic Wars (1796–1814). After the Congress of Vienna (1815), 39 states formed the German Confederation. The Confederation was dissolved after the Austro-Prussian War in which Prussia defeated Austria and forced Austria to remove itself from the affairs of the German states.

Territorial boundaries were essentially redrawn as a result of military conflicts and interventions from the outside: from the Napoleonic Wars to the Congress of Vienna, the number of territories decreased from about 300 to 39; in 1866 Prussia annexed the sovereign states of Hanover, Nassau, Hesse-Kassel, and the Free City of Frankfurt. Prussia and the other states in Northern and Central Germany united as a federal state, the North German Federation, on 1 July 1867. Four of the five southern German states (Bavaria, Württemberg, Baden and Hesse-Darmstadt) entered military alliances with Prussia but Austria did not. In the Franco-Prussian War of 1870–71, those four states joined the North German Federation which was consequently renamed to German Empire. The parliament and Federal Council decided to give the Prussian king the title of German Emperor (since 1 January 1871). The new German Empire included 25 states (three of them, Hanseatic cities) and the imperial territory of Alsace-Lorraine. Within the empire, 65% of the territory and 62% of the population belonged to the state of Prussia.

After the territorial losses of the Treaty of Versailles, the remaining states continued as republics of a new German federation. The debate on a new delimitation of the German territory started in 1919 as part of discussions about the new constitution. Hugo Preuss, the father of the Weimar Constitution, drafted a plan to divide the German Reich into 14 roughly equal-sized states. His proposal was turned down due to opposition of the states and concerns of the government. Article 18 of the constitution enabled a new delimitation of the German territory but set high hurdles: "Three fifth of the votes handed in, and at least the majority of the population are necessary to decide on the alteration of territory". In fact, until 1933 there were only four changes in the configuration of the German states: The 7 Thuringian states were merged in 1920, whereby Coburg opted for Bavaria, Pyrmont joined Prussia in 1922, and Waldeck did so in 1929. Any later plans to break up the dominating Prussia into smaller states failed because political circumstances were not favourable to state reforms.

Three changes are of particular note: on January 1, 1934, Mecklenburg-Schwerin was united with the neighbouring Mecklenburg-Strelitz; and, by the Greater Hamburg Act of 1937, the area of the city-state was extended, while Lübeck lost its independence and became part of the Prussian province of Schleswig-Holstein.

West Germany, 1945–1990

During the Allied occupation of Germany after World War II, internal borders were redrawn by the Allied military governments. New states were established in all four zones of occupation: Bremen, Hesse, Württemberg-Baden, and Bavaria in the American zone; Hamburg, Schleswig-Holstein, Lower Saxony, and North Rhine-Westphalia in the British zone; Rhineland-Palatinate, Baden, Württemberg-Hohenzollern and the Saarland which later received a special status in the French zone; Mecklenburg(-Vorpommern), Brandenburg, Saxony, Saxony-Anhalt, and Thuringia in the Soviet zone. No single state comprised more than 30% of either population or territory; this was intended to prevent any one state from being as dominant within Germany as Prussia had been in the past. Initially, only seven of the pre-War states remained: Baden (in part), Bavaria (reduced in size), Bremen, Hamburg, Hesse (enlarged), Saxony, and Thuringia. The states with hyphenated names, such as Rhineland-Palatinate, North Rhine-Westphalia, and Saxony-Anhalt, owed their existence to the occupation powers and were created out of mergers of former Prussian provinces and smaller states.

Former German territory that lay east of the Oder-Neisse line fell under either Polish or Soviet administration but attempts were made at least symbolically not to abandon sovereignty well into the 1960s. The former provinces of Farther Pomerania, East Prussia, Silesia and Posen-West Prussia fell under Polish administration with the Soviet Union taking the area around Königsberg (now Kaliningrad), pending a final peace conference with Germany which eventually never took place. More than 8 million Germans had been expelled from these territories that had formed part of the German-speaking lands for centuries and which mostly did not have sizable Polish minorities before 1945. However, no attempts were made to establish new states in these territories, as they lay outside the jurisdiction of West Germany at that time.

In 1948, the military governors of the three Western Allies handed over the so-called Frankfurt Documents to the minister-presidents in the Western occupation zones. Among other things, they recommended revising the boundaries of the West German states in a way that none of them should be too large or too small in comparison with the others.

As the premiers did not come to an agreement on this question, the Parliamentary Council was supposed to address this issue. Its provisions are reflected in Article 29 of the Basic Law. There was a binding provision for a new delimitation of the federal territory: the Federal Territory must be revised (paragraph 1). Moreover, in territories or parts of territories whose affiliation with a  had changed after 8 May 1945 without a referendum, people were allowed to petition for a revision of the current status within a year after the promulgation of the Basic Law (paragraph 2). If at least one tenth of those entitled to vote in Bundestag elections were in favour of a revision, the federal government had to include the proposal into its legislation. Then a referendum was required in each territory or part of a territory whose affiliation was to be changed (paragraph 3). The proposal should not take effect if within any of the affected territories a majority rejected the change. In this case, the bill had to be introduced again and after passing had to be confirmed by referendum in the Federal Republic as a whole (paragraph 4). The reorganization should be completed within three years after the Basic Law had come into force (paragraph 6). Article 29 states that "the division of the federal territory into Länder may be revised to ensure that each  be of a size and capacity to perform its functions effectively". 

In their letter to Konrad Adenauer, the three western military governors approved the Basic Law but suspended Article 29 until such time as a peace treaty should be concluded. Only the special arrangement for the southwest under Article 118 could enter into force.

Upon its founding in 1949, West Germany thus had eleven states. These were reduced to nine in 1952 when three south-western states (South Baden, Württemberg-Hohenzollern, and Württemberg-Baden) merged to form Baden-Württemberg. From 1957, when the French-occupied Saar Protectorate was returned and formed into the Saarland, the Federal Republic consisted of ten states, which are referred to as the "Old States" today. West Berlin was under the sovereignty of the Western Allies and neither a Western German state nor part of one. However, it was in many ways de facto integrated with West Germany under a special status.

A new delimitation of the federal territory has been discussed since the Federal Republic was founded in 1949 and even before. Committees and expert commissions advocated a reduction of the number of states; academics (Werner Rutz, Meinhard Miegel, Adrian Ottnad, etc.) and politicians (Walter Döring, Hans Apel, and others) made proposals some of them far-reaching for redrawing boundaries but hardly anything came of these public discussions. Territorial reform is sometimes propagated by the richer states as a means to avoid or reduce fiscal transfers.

Establishment of Baden-Württemberg

In southwestern Germany, territorial revision seemed to be a top priority since the border between the French and American occupation zones was set along the Autobahn Karlsruhe-Stuttgart-Ulm (today the A8). Article 118 stated "The division of the territory comprising Baden, Württemberg-Baden and Württemberg-Hohenzollern into  may be revised, without regard to the provisions of Article 29, by agreement between the  concerned. If no agreement is reached, the revision shall be effected by a federal law, which shall provide for an advisory referendum." Since no agreement was reached, a referendum was held on 9 December 1951 in four different voting districts, three of which approved the merger (South Baden refused but was overruled, as the result of total votes was decisive). On 25 April 1952, the three former states merged to form Baden-Württemberg.

Petitions to reconstitute former states 
With the Paris Agreements in 1954, West Germany regained (limited) sovereignty. This triggered the start of the one-year period as set in paragraph 2 of Article 29. As a consequence, eight petitions for referendums were launched, six of which were successful:
 Reconstitution of the Free State of Oldenburg 12.9%
 Reconstitution of the Free State of Schaumburg-Lippe 15.3%
 Integration of Koblenz and Trier into North Rhine-Westphalia 14.2%
 Reintegration of Rheinhessen into Hesse 25.3%
 Reintegration of Montabaur into Hesse 20.2%
 Reconstitution of Baden 15.1%
The last petition was originally rejected by the Federal Minister of the Interior by reference to the referendum of 1951. However, the Federal Constitutional Court of Germany ruled that the rejection was unlawful: the population of Baden had the right to a new referendum because the one of 1951 had taken place under different rules from the ones provided for by article 29. In particular, the outcome of the 1951 referendum did not reflect the wishes of the majority of Baden's population.

The two Palatine petitions (for a reintegration into Bavaria and integration into Baden-Württemberg) failed with 7.6% and 9.3%. Further requests for petitions (Lübeck, Geesthacht, Lindau, Achberg, and 62 Hessian communities) had already been rejected as inadmissible by the Federal Minister of the Interior or were withdrawn as in the case of Lindau. The rejection was confirmed by the Federal Constitutional Court in the case of Lübeck.

Saar: the little reunification

In the Paris Agreements of 23 October 1954, France offered to establish an independent "Saarland", under the auspices of the Western European Union (WEU), but on 23 October 1955 in the Saar Statute referendum the Saar electorate rejected this plan by 67.7% to 32.3% (out of a 96.5% turnout: 423,434 against, 201,975 for) despite the public support of Federal German Chancellor Konrad Adenauer for the plan. The rejection of the plan by the Saarlanders was interpreted as support for the Saar to join the Federal Republic of Germany.

On 27 October 1956, the Saar Treaty established that Saarland should be allowed to join Germany, as provided by the German constitution. Saarland became part of Germany effective 1 January 1957. The Franco-Saarlander currency union ended on 6 July 1959, when the Deutsche Mark was introduced as legal tender in the Saarland.

Constitutional amendments
Paragraph 6 of Article 29 stated that, if a petition was successful, a referendum should be held within three years. Since the deadline passed on 5 May 1958 without anything happening, the Hesse state government filed a constitutional complaint with the Federal Constitutional Court in October 1958. The complaint was dismissed in July 1961 on the grounds that Article 29 had made the new delimitation of the federal territory an exclusively federal matter. At the same time, the Court reaffirmed the requirement for a territorial revision as a binding order to the relevant constitutional bodies.

The grand coalition decided to settle the 1956 petitions by setting binding deadlines for the required referendums. The referendums in Lower Saxony and Rhineland-Palatinate were to be held by 31 March 1975, and the referendum in Baden was to be held by 30 June 1970. The threshold for a successful vote was set at one-quarter of those entitled to vote in Bundestag elections. Paragraph 4 stated that the vote should be disregarded if it contradicted the objectives of paragraph 1.

In his investiture address, given on 28 October 1969 in Bonn, Chancellor Willy Brandt proposed that the government would consider Article 29 of the Basic Law as a binding order. An expert commission was established, named after its chairman, the former Secretary of State Professor Werner Ernst. After two years of work, the experts delivered their report in 1973. It provided an alternative proposal for the two regions: the north and center-southwest.

In the north, either a single new state consisting of Schleswig-Holstein, Hamburg, Bremen and Lower Saxony should be created (solution A) or two new states, one in the northeast consisting of Schleswig-Holstein, Hamburg and the northern part of Lower Saxony (from Cuxhaven to Lüchow-Dannenberg) and one in the northwest consisting of Bremen and the rest of Lower Saxony (solution B).

In the center and southwest, one alternative was that Rhineland-Palatinate (with the exception of the Germersheim district but including the Rhine-Neckar region) should be merged with Hesse and the Saarland (solution C), the district of Germersheim would then become part of Baden-Württemberg. The other alternative was that the Palatinate (including the region of Worms) could be merged with the Saarland and Baden-Württemberg, and the rest of Rhineland-Palatinate would then merge with Hesse (solution D).

Both alternatives could be combined (AC, BC, AD, BD).

At the same time, the commission developed criteria for classifying the terms of Article 29 Paragraph 1. The capacity to perform functions effectively was considered most important, whereas regional, historical, and cultural ties were considered as hardly verifiable. To fulfill administrative duties adequately, a population of at least five million per state was considered as necessary.

After a relatively brief discussion and mostly negative responses from the affected states, the proposals were shelved. Public interest was limited or nonexistent.

The referendum in Baden was held on 7 June 1970. 81.9% of voters decided for Baden to remain part of Baden-Württemberg, only 18.1% opted for the reconstitution of the old state of Baden.

The referendums in Lower Saxony and Rhineland-Palatinate were held on 19 January 1975 (the percentages given are the percentages of those eligible who voted in favour):
 reconstitution of the Free State of Oldenburg 31%
 reconstitution of the Free State of Schaumburg-Lippe 39.5% 
 integration of Koblenz and Trier into North Rhine-Westphalia 13% 
 reintegration of Rheinhessen into Hesse 7.1% 
 reintegration of Montabaur region into Hesse 14.3%

The votes in Lower Saxony were successful as both proposals were supported by more than 25% of eligible voters. The Bundestag however decided that both Oldenburg and Schaumburg-Lippe should remain part of Lower Saxony. The justification was that a reconstitution of the two former states would contradict the objectives of paragraph 1 of article 29 of the constitution. An appeal against the decision was rejected as inadmissible by the Federal Constitutional Court.

On 24 August 1976, the binding provision for a new delimitation of the federal territory was altered into a mere discretionary one. Paragraph 1 of Article 29 was rephrased, with the provision that any state had to be "of a size and capacity to perform its functions effectively" put first. The option for a referendum in the Federal Republic as a whole (paragraph 4) was abolished, which meant territorial revision was no longer possible against the will of the population affected by it.

Reunited Germany, 1990–present
East Germany had originally consisted of five states (i.e., Brandenburg, Mecklenburg-Vorpommern, Saxony, Saxony-Anhalt, and Thuringia). In 1952, these states were abolished and the East was divided into 14 administrative districts called Bezirke. Soviet-controlled East Berlin – despite officially having the same status as West Berlin – was declared East Germany's capital and its 15th district.

The debate on territorial revision restarted shortly before German reunification. While academics (Rutz and others) and politicians (Gobrecht) suggested introducing only two, three, or four states in East Germany, legislation reconstituted the East German states in an arrangement similar to that which they had had before 1952, as the five "New States" on 3 October 1990. The former district of East Berlin joined West Berlin to form the new state of Berlin. Henceforth, the 10 "old states" plus 5 "new states" plus the new state Berlin add up to current 16 states of Germany.

After reunification, the constitution was amended to state that the citizens of the 16 states had successfully achieved the unity of Germany in free self-determination and that the West German constitution thus applied to the entire German people. Article 23, which had allowed "any other parts of Germany" to join, was rephrased. It had been used in 1957 to reintegrate the Saar Protectorate as the Saarland into the Federal Republic, and this was used as a model for German reunification in 1990. The amended article now defines the participation of the Federal Council and the 16 German states in matters concerning the European Union. Article 29 was again modified and provided an option for the states to "revise the division of their existing territory or parts of their territory by agreement without regard to the provisions of paragraphs (2) through (7)". Article 118a was introduced into the Basic Law and provided the possibility for Berlin and Brandenburg to merge "without regard to the provisions of Article 29, by agreement between the two  with the participation of their inhabitants who are entitled to vote". A state treaty between Berlin and Brandenburg was approved in both parliaments with the necessary two-thirds majority, but in a popular referendum of 5 May 1996, about 63% voted against the merger.

The German states can conclude treaties with foreign countries in matters within their own sphere of competence and with the consent of the federal government (Article 32 of the Basic Law). Typical treaties relate to cultural relationships and economic affairs.

Some states call themselves a "free state". It is merely a historic synonym for "republic" and was a description used by most German states after the abolishment of monarchy after World War I. Today,  is associated emotionally with a more independent status, especially in Bavaria. However, it has no legal significance.

Politics

Germany is a federal, parliamentary, representative democratic republic. The German political system operates under a framework laid out in the 1949 constitutional document known as the Grundgesetz (Basic Law). By calling the document the Grundgesetz, rather than Verfassung (constitution), the authors expressed the intention that it would be replaced by a true constitution once Germany was reunited as one state.

Amendments to the Grundgesetz generally require a two-thirds majority of both chambers of the parliament; the fundamental principles of the constitution, as expressed in the articles guaranteeing human dignity, the separation of powers, the federal structure, and the rule of law are valid in perpetuity. Despite the original intention, the Grundgesetz remained in effect after the German reunification in 1990, with only minor amendments.

Government

The federal constitution stipulates that the structure of each Federated State's government must "conform to the principles of republican, democratic, and social government, based on the rule of law" (Article 28). Most of the states are governed by a cabinet led by a Ministerpräsident (minister-president), together with a unicameral legislative body known as the Landtag (State Diet). The states are parliamentary republics and the relationship between their legislative and executive branches mirrors that of the federal system: the legislatures are popularly elected for four or five years (depending on the state), and the minister-president is then chosen by a majority vote among the Landtags members. The minister-president is typically the head of the biggest party of a coalition. The minister-president appoints a cabinet to run the state's agencies and to carry out the executive duties of the state's government. Like in other parliamentary systems, the legislature can dismiss or replace the minister-president after a successful no-confidence vote.

The governments in Berlin, Bremen and Hamburg are referred to as "senates". In the free states of Bavaria and Saxony, the government is referred to as "state government" (Staatsregierung); and in the other states, the government is referred to as "Land government" (Landesregierung). Before January 1, 2000, Bavaria had a bicameral parliament, with a popularly elected Landtag, and a Senate made up of representatives of the state's major social and economic groups. The Senate was abolished following a referendum in 1998. The states of Berlin, Bremen, and Hamburg are governed slightly differently from the other states. In each of those cities, the executive branch consists of a Senate of approximately eight, selected by the state's parliament; the senators carry out duties equivalent to those of the ministers in the larger states. The equivalent of the minister-president is the Senatspräsident (president of the senate), also commonly referred to as Bürgermeister (Mayor) in Bremen, the Erster Bürgermeister (first mayor) in Hamburg, and the Regierender Bürgermeister (governing mayor) in Berlin. The parliament for Berlin is called the Abgeordnetenhaus (House of Representatives), while Bremen and Hamburg both have a Bürgerschaft. The parliaments in the remaining 13 states are referred to as Landtag (State Parliament).

Subdivisions

The city-states of Berlin and Hamburg are subdivided into Districts. The City of Bremen consists of two urban districts: Bremen and Bremerhaven, which are not contiguous. In the other states there are the subdivisions below.

Area associations (Landschaftsverbände)
The most populous state of North Rhine-Westphalia is uniquely divided into two area associations (Landschaftsverbände), one for the Rhineland, and one for Westphalia-Lippe. This arrangement was meant to ease the friction caused by uniting the two culturally different regions into a single state after World War II. The Landschaftsverbände now have very little power.

The constitution of Mecklenburg-Vorpommern at §75 states the right of Mecklenburg and Vorpommern to form Landschaftsverbände, although these two constituent parts of the state are not represented in the current administrative division.

Governmental districts (Regierungsbezirke)
The large states of Baden-Württemberg, Bavaria, Hesse, and North Rhine-Westphalia are divided into governmental districts, or Regierungsbezirke.

In Rhineland-Palatinate, these districts were abolished on January 1, 2000, in Saxony-Anhalt on January 1, 2004, and in Lower Saxony on January 1, 2005. From 1990 until 2012, Saxony was divided into three districts (called Direktionsbezirke since 2008).

Administrative districts (Kreise)

The Districts of Germany (Kreise) are administrative districts, and every state except the city-states of Berlin and Hamburg and the state of Bremen consists of "rural districts" (Landkreise), District-free Towns/Cities (Kreisfreie Städte, in Baden-Württemberg also called "urban districts", or Stadtkreise), cities that are districts in their own right, or local associations of a special kind (Kommunalverbände besonderer Art), see below. The state Free Hanseatic City of Bremen consists of two urban districts, while Berlin and Hamburg are states and urban districts at the same time.

As of 2011, there are 295 Landkreise and 107 Kreisfreie Städte, making 402 districts altogether. Each consists of an elected council and an executive, which is chosen either by the council or by the people, depending on the state, the duties of which are comparable to those of a county executive in the United States, supervising local government administration. The Landkreise have primary administrative functions in specific areas, such as highways, hospitals, and public utilities.

Local associations of a special kind are an amalgamation of one or more Landkreise with one or more Kreisfreie Städte to form a replacement of the aforementioned administrative entities at the district level. They are intended to implement simplification of administration at that level. Typically, a district-free city or town and its urban hinterland are grouped into such an association, or Kommunalverband besonderer Art. Such an organization requires the issuing of special laws by the governing state, since they are not covered by the normal administrative structure of the respective states.

In 2010 only three Kommunalverbände besonderer Art exist.
 District of Hanover: formed in 2001 from the rural district of Hanover and the district-free city of Hanover.
 Regionalverband (district association) of Saarbrücken: formed in 2008 from the Stadtverband Saarbrücken (city association of Saarbrücken), which was formed in 1974.
 City region of Aachen: formed in 2009 from the rural district of Aachen and the district-free city of Aachen.

Offices (Ämter)
Ämter ("offices" or "bureaus"): in some states, there is an administrative unit between the districts and the municipalities, called Ämter (singular Amt), Amtsgemeinden, Gemeindeverwaltungsverbände, Landgemeinden, Verbandsgemeinden, Verwaltungsgemeinschaften, or Kirchspiellandgemeinden.

Municipalities (Gemeinden)

Municipalities (Gemeinden): every rural district and every Amt is subdivided into municipalities, while every urban district is a municipality in its own right. There are  12,141 municipalities, which are the smallest administrative units in Germany. Cities and towns are municipalities as well, also having city rights or town rights (Stadtrechte). Nowadays, this is mostly just the right to be called a city or town. However, in former times there were many other privileges, including the right to impose local taxes or to allow industry only within city limits.

The number of inhabitants of German municipalities differs greatly, the most populous municipality being Berlin with nearly 3.8 million inhabitants, while the least populous municipalities (for instance, Gröde in Nordfriesland) have less than 10 inhabitants.

The municipalities are ruled by elected councils and by an executive, the mayor, who is chosen either by the council or directly by the people, depending on the state. The "constitution" for the municipalities is created by the states and is uniform throughout a state (except for Bremen, which allows Bremerhaven to have its own constitution).

The municipalities have two major policy responsibilities. First, they administer programs authorized by the federal or state government. Such programs typically relate to youth, schools, public health, and social assistance. Second, Article 28(2) of the Basic Law guarantees the municipalities "the right to regulate on their own responsibility all the affairs of the local community within the limits set by law". Under this broad statement of competence, local governments can justify a wide range of activities. For instance, many municipalities develop and expand the economic infrastructure of their communities through the development of industrial trading estates.

Local authorities foster cultural activities by supporting local artists, building arts centres, and by holding fairs. Local government also provides public utilities, such as gas and electricity, as well as public transportation. The majority of the funding for municipalities is provided by higher levels of government rather than from taxes raised and collected directly by themselves.

In five of the German states, there are unincorporated areas, in many cases unpopulated forest and mountain areas, but also four Bavarian lakes that are not part of any municipality. As of January 1, 2005, there were 246 such areas, with a total area of 4167.66 km2 or 1.2% of the total area of Germany. Only four unincorporated areas are populated, with a total population of around 2,000. The table below provides an overview.

However, the unincorporated areas are continually being incorporated into neighboring municipalities, wholly or partially, most frequently in Bavaria.

See also

 Cantons of Switzerland
 Composition of the German state parliaments
 Elections in Germany
 German Bundesländer €2 coins
 Landespolizei'' – German state police
 List of administrative divisions by country
 List of cities and towns in Germany
 List of German states by area
 List of German states by exports
 List of German states by fertility rate
 List of German states by GRP
 List of German states by household income
 List of German states by Human Development Index
 List of German states by life expectancy
 List of German states by population
 List of German states by population density
 List of German states by unemployment rate
 List of states in the Holy Roman Empire – the German states prior to 1815
 States of Austria

Notes

References

External links
 CityMayors feature on Germany subdivisions

 
Subdivisions of Germany
States
Germany 1
First-level administrative divisions by country
Germany geography-related lists